Gelechia dujardini is a moth of the family Gelechiidae. It is found in France (Alpes Maritimes), Croatia, North Macedonia, Greece, Italy and Turkey.

References

Moths described in 1991
Gelechia